Jimmy Gunn (November 27, 1948 – April 11, 2015) was an American football linebacker in the National Football League (NFL). He was born in Augusta, Arkansas. He prepped at Lincoln High School in San Diego.

College career
Gunn was a 1969 All-American defensive end at the University of Southern California.  Also was All-Pac-8, and in USC's Hall of Fame.

In 1969, he teamed with All-Americans Al Cowlings and Charlie Weaver, Tody Smith, and Bubba Scott to form a defensive front that powered the Trojans to 10-0-1 record and a win over the University of Michigan in the 1970 Rose Bowl. Coach John McKay credited a six-man front on defense for the victory, big Tony Terry was added to the group known as the "Wild Bunch" consisting of Jimmy Gunn, Charlie Weaver, Al Cowlings, Tody Smith and Bubba Scott.

Professional career
Gunn played professionally for the Chicago Bears, New York Giants and Tampa Bay Buccaneers between 1970 and 1976.

Death
Gunn died of heart failure on April 11, 2015.

References

1948 births
2015 deaths
American football linebackers
African-American players of American football
USC Trojans football players
Chicago Bears players
New York Giants players
Tampa Bay Buccaneers players
Players of American football from Arkansas
People from Augusta, Arkansas
20th-century African-American sportspeople
21st-century African-American people